The 1981 Anson by-election was held on 31 October 1981 with J. B. Jeyaretnam from the Worker's Party as the winning candidate. This followed the incumbent MP Devan Nair stepping down in order to become President of Singapore. 

The by-election marked the first occasion since Singapore's independence in which a PAP candidate was defeated in an election for a seat in Parliament. The 37% swing against the PAP is the largest ever swing in a by-election in independent Singapore, and the second largest since 1961.

Candidates 
The Nomination Day for the by-election was 21 October 1981. The election deposit for candidates was set at $1500. Three candidates stood in the by-election: Pang Kim Hin (the nephew of former minister Lim Kim San) of the PAP, J.B. Jeyaretnam of the Worker's Party and Harbans Singh of the United People's Front (UPF). The leader of the Singapore Democratic Party (SDP), Chiam See Tong, also considered standing in the by-election, but decided to withdraw at the last minute and leave Jeyaretnam to be the PAP's main opponent in the name of "opposition unity".

Result 

Note: As Habans Singh of United People's Front failed to garner the minimum 12.5% (one-eighth) of the votes necessary to keep his deposit, his election deposit was forfeited.

Reasons for the PAP's defeat 
A number of factors are thought to have contributed to ruling party's defeat in this by-election. One of them was the fact that Pang was a new face to the public in Singapore whereas Jeyaretnam was a veteran of several general elections and by-elections (though this was the first time he had stood in Anson). Another factor may have been that Pang did not make use of Anson's grassroots leaders during his campaign. Another issue surrounding the campaign was that residents in the Blair Plain area of the constituency were unhappy that they were not being given priority for HDB flats when their homes were being demolished to make way for a new Port of Singapore Authority container complex, and some voters may have used the by-election as an opportunity to express discontent regarding this.

Historical significance
This is one of the most significant elections in Singapore's political history because it was the first opposition victory since the Barisan Sosialis had left Parliament in 1966. It was the third by-election to have been held in Anson. 

The election marked the Workers' Party's return to Parliament after 18 years. The last time they won an election was back in 1961, when David Marshall also won a by-election in Anson as a candidate for the party (however he lost the seat in the 1963 general election).

Aftermath of the by-election 
Following the by-election, Pang announced his retirement of politics, though he was offered a place in the next election, he ultimately declined, making him the first PAP candidate to never enter parliament. He remained the only candidate to do so until Eric Low in the 2001 election before retiring in 2011.

Jeyaretnam successfully retained the seat with a larger majority of 2,376 votes in the 1984 general election, when he defeated the PAP's Ng Pock Too. He captured 56.8% of the votes in the constituency in that election. Another opposition politician was also elected to Parliament at the 1984 general election - Chiam See Tong of the SDP, who was elected as the MP for Potong Pasir. Chiam would go on to represent the seat for a further six terms until 2011 and become Singapore's second longest-serving opposition MP.

However, Jeyaretnam was convicted for allegedly misreporting his party accounts and was forced to vacate the Anson seat in 1986. The constituency was abolished in 1988 and split between the Tanjong Pagar and Kreta Ayer constituency, with a significant of the portion also forming the Tiong Bahru Group Representation Constituency in 1988 election. Tiong Bahru was then absorbed into the Tanjong Pagar Group Representation constituency at the 1991 general election. As of the 2020 elections, Anson was based on Radin Mas SMC, while WP had won 10 seats in parliament including its stronghold of Hougang SMC as well as Aljunied GRC and Sengkang GRC, for the former it became the longest-held opposition ward since 1991.

Harbans Singh became the first candidate in Singapore election history to have forfeited his election deposit twice, with the first occurring on the 1976 elections contesting under Tanjong Pagar with 11.0% of the valid votes. Until the 2013 by-election, WP's Lee Li Lian repeated the end outcome as she won a seat from the incumbent PAP of Punggol East SMC (now as a division under Sengkang GRC), while Singapore Democratic Alliance candidate Desmond Lim repeated the feat on losing his deposit twice after he lost his deposit first during the 2011 election that held prior.

Although the PAP has remained the dominant party in Singapore politics due to a supermajority, it has never again held a complete monopoly of all the seats in Parliament since the 1981 by-election.

Past result, 1980

References

External links
1981 By Election
Results of 1981 BE

1981
1981 elections in Asia
1981 in Singapore
October 1981 events in Asia